The Church of Jesus Christ of Latter-day Saints (LDS Church) has been present in Albania since at least the early 1990s.  In 1993, there were approximately 100 members in the country. In 2021, there were 3,280 members in 14 congregations.

History

Elders Dallin H. Oaks and Hans B. Ringger visited Albania in April 1991.  Elder Hans B. Ringger and Austria Vienna Mission President Kenneth D. Reber visited with Albanian officials and agreed to send humanitarian aid.  In February 1992, humanitarian missionary couples Thales and Charone Smith and Randolyn Brady and Melvin Brady. Thales taught in the medical school at the University of Tirana and Charone served in a pediatric orphanage. Mel taught business and economics at the University of Tirane, while Randy taught English and music. In August 1993, Mother Teresa visited the orphanage where Charone Smith was working and presented her a silver medallion of Mother Teresa's order.

The first full time missionaries arrived in June. Albania's first convert, Blendi Kokona, was baptized on July 25, 1992.  The Book of Mormon was translated into Albanian and published in November 1999.  The first seminary class was held on February 24, 2000, and the first Institute class was held on March 24, 2000.

The first Church-built meetinghouse was completed in 2006.  Elder D. Todd Christofferson attended an opening of a school for Roma Children in 2009. On March 9, 2014, the Tirana Albania Stake was organized.

Stake and District

As of February 2023, the following stake and district was located in Albania:

Tirana Albania Stake
Durrës Ward
Tirana 1st Ward
Tirana 2nd Ward
Tirana 3rd Ward
Tirana 4th Ward
Vlorë Ward
Shkodër Branch

Elbasan Albania District
Berat Branch
Elbasan Branch
Fier Branch
Korçë Branch
Lushnjë Branch
Pogradec Branch

Other Congregations
The following congregations are not part of a stake or district:
Adriatic South Mission Branch

Congregations not within a stake are named branches, regardless of size. The Adriatic South Mission Branch serves individuals and families not in proximity to a church meetinghouse.

Missions
When missionaries first arrived in Albania, it was part of the Austria Vienna Mission. The Provo Missionary Center began teaching Albanian in 1994. Prior to that, missionaries learned it after arrival in Albania. Responsibility of missionary efforts in Albania was transferred to the Greece Athens Mission in 1995. On July 1, 1996, the Albania Tirana Mission was organized which was later renamed the Adriatic South Mission. As of 2023, the Adriatic South Mission serves Albania, Cyprus, Greece, Kosovo, and North Macedonia.

Cyprus
The LDS Church reported 534 members in 4 congregations as well as 3 family history centers in Cyprus for year-end 2021. These congregations are part of the Nicosia Cyprus District which includes the Larnaca Branch, Limassol Branch, Nicosia Branch, Northern Cyprus Branch, and Paphos Branch. The Northern Cyprus Branch was created on July 24, 2022 being the first in the Turkish Republic of Northern Cyprus. Family history centers are located in Larnaca, Limassol, and Nicosia.

Greece
The LDS Church reported 792 members in 2 congregations in Greece for year-end 2021. These congregations consist of the Halandri Branch and the Thessaloniki Branch.

Kosovo
The LDS Church reported 102 members in 2 congregations in Kosovo for year-end 2017. The LDS Church has not released any membership statistics since. These congregations consist of the Gjakova Branch and the Pristina Branch.

North Macedonia
The LDS Church reported 41 members in a single congregation, the Skopje Branch, in North Macedonia for year-end 2018. The LDS Church has not released any membership statistics since.

Temples
As of June 2021, Albania was located in the Rome Italy Temple District.

References

External links
 The Church of Jesus Christ of Latter-day Saints - Albania - Official Site (Albanian)
 The Church of Jesus Christ of Latter-day Saints - Albania - Newsroom (Albanian)
 ComeUntoChrist.org - Visitors Site

Christian denominations in Albania
The Church of Jesus Christ of Latter-day Saints in Europe